Kevon Lambert (born 22 March 1997) is a Jamaican professional footballer who plays as a defender and midfielder for USL Championship club Phoenix Rising FC and the Jamaica national team.

Club career

Montego Bay United
Lambert joined Montego Bay United in September 2016, having previously played football at Glenmuir High School, where he won the 2012 daCosta Cup, and was named captain in his last year. Prior to joining MBU, he spent time on trial with Premier League club West Ham alongside compatriot Rodave Murray in 2016.

He made his debut for MBU in November 2016, deputising for injured midfielder Dwayne Ambusley against Arnett Gardens.

In spring/summer of 2017, Lambert spent the month of May on trial with Serbian side FK Vojvodina, but was unable to sign a professional contract due to European Work Permit complications.

Phoenix Rising FC

Phoenix Rising FC signed Lambert on 10 August 2017. Lambert re-signed with Phoenix Rising FC for the 2019 season.

International career
Lambert was called up to the Jamaica Under 20 side in 2016 to play in qualification games for the 2017 CONCACAF U-20 Championship.

Lambert was called up by Jamaica head coach Theodore Whitmore in February 2017, to play against the USA, however he remained on the bench. He made his senior international debut 13 days later, on 16 February 2017, starting in a 1-0 win over Honduras.

Career statistics

Club

Notes

International

Achievements

Jamaica
Caribbean Cup Runner-up: 2017
CONCACAF Gold Cup Runner-up: 2017

Phoenix Rising FC
 USL Cup 
Runner-up: 2018
USLC Regular Season
Winners: 2019
Western ConferenceWinners (Playoffs): 2018, 2020Winners (Regular Season)': 2019

References

External links
 Kevon Lambert at caribbeanfootballdatabase.com

1997 births
Living people
Jamaican footballers
Jamaica international footballers
Association football defenders
Association football midfielders
Montego Bay United F.C. players
Phoenix Rising FC players
National Premier League players
2017 CONCACAF Gold Cup players
USL Championship players
Jamaica under-20 international footballers
2019 CONCACAF Gold Cup players